Bob Bryan and Bob Bryan were the defending champions.  They successfully defended their title, defeating Jaroslav Levinský and Robert Lindstedt 6–3, 6–2 in the final.

Seeds

Draw

Draw

External links
Draw

Tennis Channel Open
2006 ATP Tour
2006 Tennis Channel Open